Nermin Šabić (born 21 December 1973) is a Bosnian professional football manager and former player.

Playing career

Club
Born in Zenica, SR Bosnia and Herzegovina, back then part of SFR Yugoslavia, Šabić started playing with hometown club Čelik Zenica having played with them in the 1990–91 Yugoslav First League season. Afterwards, he moved to Red Star Belgrade but with the start of the Yugoslav Wars he left the club along with Goran Jurić and Robert Prosinečki.

Šabić then moved to Croatia where he played for almost a decade in the Croatian First League, first with Dubrava, Zagreb, Inter Zaprešić, Osijek and Zadar, and then with Dinamo Zagreb, know back then as Croatia Zagreb, between 1997 and 2001, winning with them 3 championships (the last 3 of the 5 in-a-row Zagreb won) and two cups. He spent the second half of the 2000–01 season in Bosnia playing with Željezničar and had also won the double with them. 

Šabić then returned to Croatia and was part of the championship winning squad of Zagreb in the season 2001–02. Afterwards, he played 3 seasons in China with Changchun Yatai, before returning to Bosnia to his former club Čelik where he finished his career in 2010.

International
From 1994 to 1995, Šabić represented the Croatia national U21 team, making 6 appearances.

He then made his senior debut for Bosnia and Herzegovina in an April 1996 friendly match against Albania and has earned a total of 38 caps (2 unofficial), scoring 1 goal. His final international was an August 2008 friendly match against Bulgaria.

Managerial career
After retiring, Šabić held the position of CEO of Čelik Zenica in 2011, and in June 2015 he became assistant manager of Ibrahim Rahimić, at Bosnian Premier League newly promoted side Mladost Doboj Kakanj, where he also accumulated the function of main coordinator of the youth teams in the club.

On 13 June 2017, Šabić became the new manager of First League of FBiH club Zvijezda Gradačac. On 10 April 2018, he left Zvijezda to become the manager of Mladost Doboj Kakanj. He officially took over the club the next day on 11 April. After a terrible start to the league which culminated even more with a 93rd minute 0–1 home league loss against Široki Brijeg on 15 August 2018, Šabić left the club the next day.

For a short period from January to February 2019, he was in charge of China League Two club Shanxi Metropolis. On 8 September 2019, Šabić became the new manager of First League of FBiH club TOŠK Tešanj. In his first game as TOŠK manager, his team beat Metalleghe-BSI 2–1 at home in a league match. He left TOŠK on 23 December 2019, taking over the position of head coach of the Bosnia and Herzegovina U17 national team two days earlier, on 21 December. He officially took over the position four days later, on 27 December, signing a contract with the Bosnia and Herzegovina FA.

Career statistics

International goals
''Scores and results table. Bosnia and Herzegovina's goal tally first:

Managerial statistics

Honours

Player
Dinamo Zagreb
Prva HNL: 1997–98, 1998–99, 1999–00
Croatian Cup: 1997–98, 2000–01

Željezničar 
Bosnian Premier League: 2000–01
Bosnian Cup: 2001

Zagreb  
Prva HNL: 2001–02

References

External links
 
Nermin Šabić at Soccerway

1973 births
Living people
Sportspeople from Zenica
Association football midfielders
Yugoslav footballers
Croatian footballers
Croatia under-21 international footballers
Bosniaks of Croatia
Bosnia and Herzegovina footballers
Bosnia and Herzegovina international footballers
NK Čelik Zenica players
Red Star Belgrade footballers
NK Zagreb players
NK Inter Zaprešić players
NK Osijek players
NK Zadar players
GNK Dinamo Zagreb players
FK Željezničar Sarajevo players
Changchun Yatai F.C. players
Yugoslav Second League players
Yugoslav First League players
Croatian Football League players
Premier League of Bosnia and Herzegovina players
China League One players
Bosnia and Herzegovina expatriate footballers
Expatriate footballers in Serbia and Montenegro
Bosnia and Herzegovina expatriate sportspeople in Serbia and Montenegro
Expatriate footballers in Croatia
Bosnia and Herzegovina expatriate sportspeople in Croatia
Expatriate footballers in China
Bosnia and Herzegovina expatriate sportspeople in China
Bosnia and Herzegovina football managers
NK Zvijezda Gradačac managers 
FK Mladost Doboj Kakanj managers
Shanxi Metropolis F.C. managers
NK TOŠK Tešanj managers
Bosnia and Herzegovina expatriate football managers
Expatriate football managers in China